Sir Rodney George Brooke CBE DL is a British former civil servant. He was chairman of the General Social Care Council.

He was knighted in the 2007 Birthday Honours.

References

Date of birth missing (living people)
Living people
British civil servants
Commanders of the Order of the British Empire
Deputy Lieutenants of Greater London
Year of birth missing (living people)